Charles Winslow Gates (January 12, 1856 in Franklin, Vermont – July 1, 1927) was an American politician who served as the 55th governor of Vermont from 1915 to 1917.

Biography
Gates was born January 12, 1856, son of Harrison and Leona Rebecca (Shedd) Gates, in Franklin, Vermont. He graduated from St. Johnsbury Academy in 1880, and was a teacher and principal of the Franklin Academy until 1884. He married Mary Elizabeth Hayden on April 9, 1890. They had one daughter, Edith Rebecca, and two sons, Paul Hayden and Winslow Harrison.

Career
Gates purchased a mercantile in 1884 which he operated successfully while maintaining his homestead farm. President of the Franklin County Fair Association and a Director of the Enosburg Falls Savings Bank, he also founded the Franklin Telephone Company in 1895.  He served in the Vermont House from 1899 to 1900, in the state Senate from 1901 to 1902.  He was appointed a State Highway Commissioner in 1904 by Governor Charles Bell and again in 1906 by Governor Fletcher Proctor, serving on the commission until 1914. During his service, he secured appropriations for permanent road construction and maintenance.

Since Gates was deemed a Republican with progressive ideas, in 1914 he was nominated for governor in an attempt by Republicans to heal the rift between party activists who supported President Taft's reelection in 1912 and Progressives who supported Theodore Roosevelt. He was elected and served from January 7, 1915 to January 4, 1917. During his term Vermont enacted direct primaries for nominating US House and Senate candidates, worker's compensation, a junior and senior high school system, and a public school vocational education program. Gates was an unsuccessful candidate for the Republican US Senate nomination in 1916, after which he returned to his Franklin County business interests.

Death
Gates died on July 1, 1927, in Franklin, Vermont. He is interred at Maple Grove Cemetery in Franklin.

References

External links
The Political Graveyard

National Governors Association
The National Cyclopedia of American Biography

1856 births
1927 deaths
People from Franklin, Vermont
Republican Party governors of Vermont
Republican Party members of the Vermont House of Representatives
Republican Party Vermont state senators